James William Harrington Wood (19 January 1854 – 8 September 1937) was a New Zealand cricketer. He played in nine first-class matches for Wellington and Hawke's Bay from 1882 to 1887.

See also
 List of Wellington representative cricketers

References

External links
 

1854 births
1937 deaths
New Zealand cricketers
Hawke's Bay cricketers
Wellington cricketers
Nelson cricketers